Brian Howe may refer to:

Brian Howe (politician) (born 1936), 8th Deputy Prime Minister of Australia
Brian Howe (singer) (1953–2020), English vocalist with the 1980s and 1990s versions of Bad Company
Brian Howe (actor), American character actor best known for his major role in The Pursuit of Happyness
Brian Howe, murder victim of Mary Bell

See also
Brian Howes, Canadian musician